Angunawala is a village in Sri Lanka. It is located within Central Province. It used to be the home of the Angunawala Walauwa and the prominent Radala members of the Angunawala Family hailing from the Kandyan Kingdom.

See also
List of towns in Central Province, Sri Lanka

External links

Populated places in Kandy District